Behind the greater palatine foramen is the pyramidal process of the palatine bone, perforated by one or more lesser palatine foramina which carry the lesser palatine nerve, and marked by the commencement of a transverse ridge, for the attachment of the tendinous expansion of the tensor veli palatini.

See also
 Greater palatine foramen

References

External links
 

Bones of the head and neck